Breban may refer to:
 Bréban, a commune in the Marne department in north-eastern France

Family name 
 Nicolae Breban (born 1934, Baia Mare, Romania), a Romanian novelist and essayist

See also 
 Breb (disambiguation)
 Brebi
 Brebu (disambiguation)
 Brebina (disambiguation)
 Brebeni
 Brebenei
 Breboaia

References 

Romanian-language surnames